The 2018–19 season will be the 71st in Pakistani football. It was the first season in Pakistan football after FIFA lifted its ban on Pakistan from all footballing activities which was implemented on 10 October 2017.

National teams

Pakistan national football team

2022 FIFA World Cup qualifiers

2019

2018 SAFF Championship

Group A

Semi-final

Pakistan men's national under-15 football team

2018 SAFF U-15 Championship
Group B

Semi-finals

Finals

Pakistan women's national under-18 football team

2018 SAFF U-18 Women's Championship

Group A
Times listed are UTC+6

Pakistan women's national under-15 football team

2018 SAFF U-15 Women's Championship

Club competitions

Changes in the Premier League

Teams promoted to the 2018–19 Pakistan Premier League:
Football Federation League
 Pakistan Navy
 Baloch Nushki

Promotional play-offs
 Ashraf Sugar Mills
 Civil Aviation Authority
 Sui Northern Gas
 Sui Southern Gas

Teams relegated from the 2018–19 Pakistan Premier League:
 Karachi Port Trust
 Baloch Nushki
 Ashraf Sugar Mills
 Pakistan Airlines

Pakistan Premier League

National Challenge Cup

Bracket

References

 
Pakistan
Pakistan